Kari Kriikku (born 1960) is a Finnish classical clarinetist.

He studied at the Sibelius Academy in Helsinki, and later with Alan Hacker in England and with Leon Russianoff and Charles Neidich in the United States.

His recordings of the concertos of Carl Maria von Weber was voted "best ever" recording by Classic CD and BBC Music Magazine. In 2006, his recording of Magnus Lindberg's Clarinet Concerto (2002) won both BBC Music Magazine's award and the Gramophone Award.

Concentrating on contemporary music, Kriikku has served as an interpreter of works for the clarinet by composers such as Magnus Lindberg, Vinko Globokar, Kaija Saariaho, Jukka Tiensuu, Jouni Kaipainen, Kimmo Hakola, Esa-Pekka Salonen, Pawel Szymanski, Eero Hämeenniemi, Olli Koskelin and Usko Meriläinen. He has performed Tiensuu's clarinet concerto PURO over 30 times.

Kari Kriikku is a founding member of the Avanti! Chamber Orchestra and has served as the ensemble's artistic director since 1998.

He was the 2009 winner of the Nordic Council Music Prize: the prize committee wrote, "Kari Kriikku is an extraordinary virtuoso on his instrument, the clarinet. His performance is characterised by flexibility and a positive musician's joy – he is a musician in the best sense of the word." In late 2015, he toured with the New Zealand Symphony Orchestra under guest-conductor Miguel Harth-Bedoya.

References

External links
Kari Kriikku's website
 Kari Kriikku page at Ondine website
Kari Kriikku's management

1960 births
Finnish classical clarinetists
Living people
20th-century clarinetists
21st-century clarinetists